Nathan Méténier is a French climate and environmental activist born June 13, 1999. He is one of the yougest members of the United Nations Youth Advisory Group on Climate Change, He is the founder of Generation Climate Europe, the largest coalition of youth-led networks at the European level, pushing for stronger action from the EU on climate and environmental issues.

Life 

Nathan grew up in Grenoble. in the French Alps where he could observed first hand the effect of climate change. He declared: “I’ve seen the changes, I’ve seen the ice disappearing and the collapse on the Mont Blanc”

He has worked for and has been involved in many organisations and movements notably as Regional Director of Youth4Nature and spokesperson of Youth and Environment Europe. He graduated from Grenoble Institute of Political Studies. He is studying at the London School of Economics.

From 2019 to 2021, he was on the Board of Youth and Environment Europe.  He is founder and coordinator of Generation Climate Europe. He is ambassador for Youth4Nature. He is the founder of Generation Climate Europe, the largest coalition of youth-led networks at the European level, pushing for stronger action from the EU on climate and environmental issues. 

In July 2020, Nathan was named by United Nations Secretary-General António Guterres to his new Youth Advisory Group on Climate Change, a group of seven young climate leaders to advise him on action for the climate crisis. Metenier was one of the youngest in the group, which ranged from 18 to 28 years old. He was the only one representing France and western Europe.

Activism 
Nathan has focused notably on strengthening the voice of youth movements in Brussels.  He founded Generation Climate Europe in 2019 with the ambition to gather the main European youth movements active on environmental issues.

References

External links 

 ProActionTalk Episode 1 with Nathan Méténier 2021

1999 births
Living people